Aneta Michałek (born 8 May 1991) is a Polish former competitive figure skater. Competing in pairs with Bartosz Paluchowski, she placed 13th at the 2006 World Junior Championships. She is the 2010 Polish national champion in senior ladies' singles.

Career 
Michałek began learning to skate in 1998. She competed in partnership with Mariusz Świerguła before teaming up with Bartosz Paluchowski. Michałek/Paluchowski competed at two ISU Junior Grand Prix (JGP) events and placed 13th at the 2006 World Junior Championships in Ljubljana, Slovenia. The pair was coached by Iwona Mydlarz-Chruścińska in Oświęcim.

As a single skater, Michałek was coached by Mydlarz-Chruścińska and received two JGP assignments. She also competed at the 2008 World Junior Championships in Sofia, placing 39th. In December 2009, she outscored Anna Jurkiewicz by 3.39 points to win the senior ladies' title at the Polish Championships. She represented UKŁF Unia Oświęcim.

After retiring from competitive figure skating, Michałek became an ice hockey player. She plays for SKKH Atomówki GKS Tychy.

Programs

Ladies' singles

Pairs with Paluchowski

Competitive highlights
JGP: ISU Junior Grand Prix

Ladies' singles

Pairs with Paluchowski

Pairs with Świerguła

References

External links
 
 
 Tracings.net profile

1991 births
Living people
Polish female single skaters
Polish female pair skaters
People from Oświęcim
Sportspeople from Lesser Poland Voivodeship